The first cabinet of Stefan Löfven was the cabinet of Sweden between 2014 and 2018.  It was a coalition government, consisting of two parties: the Social Democrats and the Green Party. The cabinet was installed on 3 October 2014, following the 2014 general election. It lost a vote of no confidence following the 2018 election, but remained in office as a caretaker government. Löfven was reelected as Prime Minister in January 2019, thus forming the second cabinet of Stefan Löfven.

With only 37.9% of the popular votes in 2014 and 138 out of 349 seats (39.5%) in the Riksdag (Swedish parliament), the “red-green” coalition began as one of the weakest minority governments in Swedish history and relied on support from other parties in the Riksdag. At the 2018 election it became weaker, gaining only 32.6% of the votes. On 25 September 2018 the Riksdag passed a motion of no confidence in it by 204 votes to 142, and Löfven resigned. However, the Speaker then invited him to stay on as acting Prime Minister of a caretaker government.

2014 was the first time that the Green Party had been part of a government, and the first time in 57 years that the Social Democrats had formed a coalition cabinet. From then on, this was led by Prime Minister Stefan Löfven, leader of the Social Democrats. The cabinet consisted of 12 men and 12 women. 

The cabinet was installed following a formal government meeting with King Carl XVI Gustaf on 3 October 2014. Stefan Löfven had previously announced his cabinet ministers at 09:00 AM on the same day.

In May 2016, Löfven reshuffled his cabinet. In July 2017, three cabinet ministers (Infrastructure Minister Anna Johansson, Interior Minister Anders Ygeman, and Defense Minister Peter Hultqvist) were challenged by a vote of confidence by the opposition and a majority in the Riksdag. Löfven subsequently removed Johansson and Ygeman from office, but retained Hultqvist, and the no-confidence motion against Hultqvist collapsed in September 2017 after the Centre Party and Liberals dropped their support for it. The cabinet ruled out cooperation with the Sweden Democrats.

Ministers 
|}

Facts and statistics
The numbers below refer to the composition of the cabinet at its formation on 3 October 2014.

 Number of ministers: 24 (the Prime Minister included)
 Number of women: 12
 Number of men: 12
 Average age: 45,4
 Youngest minister: Aida Hadžialić (27 years)
 Oldest minister: Kristina Persson (68 years)
 Number of foreign-born ministers: 4

Party breakdown 
Party breakdown of cabinet ministers:

December 2014 budget crisis
On 3 December 2014, the proposed budget of the Löfven Cabinet failed in the Riksdag due to the Sweden Democrats siding with the centre-right opposition Alliance's budget. Prime Minister Löfven announced plans to call for fresh elections in March 2015. However, on 27 December, the early election was cancelled after the governing parties signed an agreement with the four parties in the opposition Alliance. Under the "Decemberöverenskommelsen" (December Agreement), the six parties agreed not to vote against a budget proposed by the government for the next eight years. The December Agreement fell in October 2015 when the Christian Democrats decided to leave it.

Policy
The government announced the outline of its policy on 3 October 2014. Plans included reducing unemployment to the lowest level in the EU by 2020, reducing deficits, phasing out nuclear energy, reducing emissions from fossil fuels and having a more socially liberal asylum policy.

In its statement the government identified as feminist. It aims to increase gender equality, reduce the gender wage gap and introduce quota if female representation on governing boards is below 40% by 2016. It also promised to increase penalties for aggravated sexual offences.

The government's foreign policy will consist of pursuing membership of the Security Council and remaining outside NATO. The government said it opposes ISIL. It was the first EU government to recognise the State of Palestine in view to "facilitate a peace agreement by making the parties less unequal", resulting in that Israel the same day recalled its ambassador for consultations.

2018-19 government formation

Prime Minister Stefan Löfven lost the motion of no confidence against him and his cabinet on 25 September 2018. 142 members of parliament voted for retaining Löfven's cabinet while 204 voted against. Löfven stated in a subsequent press conference that he would not be stepping down as Social Democratic party leader and that he would be willing to partake in talks regarding the formation of a new government, but insisted that it is ultimately up to the Speaker of the Riksdag. Löfven also stated that he finds it "completely unbelievable that the Alliance could ever form a government", if they intend on keeping their promise of not co-operating with the right-wing Sweden Democrats. Löfven and his cabinet continued to serve as a caretaker government until Löfven was reelected as Prime Minister in January 2019, 131 days after the 2018 election. 115 MPs voted to re-elect Löfven as Prime Minister, while 153 voted against him and 77 MPs, representing the Centre Party, Liberals and the Left, abstained. Since the Swedish Prime Minister is elected through negative parliamentarism, a candidate can be elected to the office if no more than 175 MPs vote against him/her.

References 

2014 establishments in Sweden
Coalition governments
Politics of Sweden
Lofven, Stefan
Lofven
2019 disestablishments in Sweden
Cabinets disestablished in 2019